Nothomiza is a genus of moth in the family Geometridae described by Warren in 1894.

Species
Nothomiza submediostrigata Wehrli, 1939
Nothomiza costalis (Moore, [1868]) Bengal
Nothomiza formosa (Butler, 1878) Japan
Nothomiza xanthocolona (Meyrick, 1897) Borneo, possibly Singapore
Nothomiza flavicosta Prout, 1914 Taiwan

References

Ourapterygini